Lenox is a city in Taylor and Adams counties in the U.S. state of Iowa. The population was 1,339 at the time of the 2020 census.

History
Lenox got its start in the year 1871, following construction of the Chicago, Burlington and Quincy Railroad through the territory.

Geography
Lenox is located at  (40.883195, -94.561293).

Demographics

2010 census
As of the census of 2010, there were 1,407 people, 609 households, and 344 families living in the city. The racial makeup of the city was 91.3% White, 0.4% African American, 0.4% Asian, 7.0% from other races, and 0.9% from two or more races. Hispanic or Latino of any race were 19.8% of the population.

There were 609 households, of which 26.4% had children under the age of 18 living with them, 43.3% were married couples living together, 8.4% had a female householder with no husband present, 4.8% had a male householder with no wife present, and 43.5% were non-families. 36.8% of all households were made up of individuals, and 20.5% had someone living alone who was 65 years of age or older. The average household size was 2.26 and the average family size was 3.01.

The median age in the city was 42 years. 24% of residents were under the age of 18; 7.4% were between the ages of 18 and 24; 20.9% were from 25 to 44; 25.7% were from 45 to 64; and 22% were 65 years of age or older. The gender makeup of the city was 48.8% male and 51.2% female.

2000 census
As of the census of 2000, there were 1,402 people, 559 households, and 335 families living in the city. The racial makeup of the city was 94.79% White, 0.71% Asian, 3.28% from other races, and 1.21% from two or more races. Hispanic or Latino of any race were 14.28% of the population.

There were 559 households, out of which 24.3% had children under the age of 18 living with them, 51.9% were married couples living together, 4.8% had a female householder with no husband present, and 39.9% were non-families. 34.3% of all households were made up of individuals, and 18.4% had someone living alone who was 65 years of age or older. The average household size was 2.33 and the average family size was 3.02.

Age spread: 22.1% under the age of 18, 8.8% from 18 to 24, 21.8% from 25 to 44, 23.1% from 45 to 64, and 24.1% who were 65 years of age or older. The median age was 43 years. For every 100 females there were 93.2 males. For every 100 females age 18 and over, there were 89.4 males.

The median income for a household in the city was $29,958, and the median income for a family was $37,917. Males had a median income of $26,938 versus $18,125 for females. The per capita income for the city was $14,299. About 5.2% of families and 14.2% of the population were below the poverty line, including 11.4% of those under age 18 and 22.8% of those age 65 or over.

Education
Lenox is a part of the Lenox Community School District.

Sports
Lenox is home to the Lenox Rodeo, held annually by the Lenox Stock and Saddle Club. 

Lenox High School won the Class 1A Iowa State Baseball Championship in 2006, and the Iowa Eight-Player Class Football State Championship in 2008. In 2009 and 2010, Lenox was runner-up in the Iowa Eight-Player Class Football State Championship to Armstrong-Ringsted.

Notable people
Rod Cless, jazz musician, born in Lenox
George R. Lunn, former US Congressman and Lt. Governor of New York
Spencer Brown, offensive tackle for the Buffalo Bills

Popular culture
Lenox was used as a shooting location for the film The Crazies (2010).

References

External links

 
City-Data Comprehensive statistical data and more about Lenox

Cities in Iowa
Cities in Adams County, Iowa
Cities in Taylor County, Iowa
1871 establishments in Iowa
Populated places established in 1871